Schrunk is a surname of German origin, possibly a variant of the surname Schrank, a topographic surname for someone who lived by a gate or fence. Notable people with the surname include:

Mike Schrunk (born 1942), American district attorney
Terry Schrunk (1913-1975), American politician

See also
Schrunk Township, Burleigh County, North Dakota, a township in North Dakota
Terry Schrunk Plaza, a park in Portland, Oregon
Schrank